Rush Township, Ohio may refer to:
 Rush Township, Champaign County, Ohio
 Rush Township, Scioto County, Ohio
 Rush Township, Tuscarawas County, Ohio

See also
 Rush Township (disambiguation)
 Rush Creek Township, Fairfield County, Ohio
 Rushcreek Township, Logan County, Ohio 

Ohio township disambiguation pages